Joel Castón is a member of the Advisory Neighborhood Commission in Washington, D.C. and is the first incarcerated person to win an election in the city.

Early life and incarceration
Castón was raised in Ward 8 of Washington, D.C. His parents separated when he was a child due to his dad's alcoholism. At age 12, Castón began dealing drugs with his cousins. When he was fifteen, his house was destroyed in a fire and his family was left homeless. In November 1994, Castón was charged with first-degree murder in the shooting death of Rafiq Washington which occurred on August 14, 1994. In 1996, he was sentenced to 35 years to life. Castón was incarcerated a federal prisons until he was transferred to the D.C. Jail in 2016.

While incarcerated, Castón earned a GED and took courses hosted by Georgetown University. Castón also led a jail newspaper and wrote papers on criminal justice reform. He was a Christian worship music leader, a financial literacy officer, and started a mentorship program called the Young Men Emerging Program.

Kim Kardashian filed a motion for Castón's release. He was granted parole in April 2021, with a release date in December 2021.

Political career
On June 15, 2021, while residing in the D.C. Jail, Castón was elected to fill a vacant Advisory Neighborhood Commission seat in Ward 7. The Advisory Neighborhood Commission seat was created in 2013, but Castón is the first person to hold the seat and the first incarcerated person elected to public office in Washington, D.C. In the election, Castón beat four other incarcerated candidates.

Personal life
Castón has one daughter. Castón is a Christian. He speaks Spanish, French, Arabic, and Mandarin.

References

Year of birth missing (living people)
Living people